Pomabamba (Quechua Pumaq pampa, pumaq cougar, pampa large plain, "cougar plain") is the largest of 4 districts in the Pomabamba Province of the Ancash Region in Peru.

Ethnic groups 
The people in the district are mainly indigenous citizens of Quechua descent. Quechua is the language which the majority of the population (76.16%) learnt to speak in childhood, 23.62% of the residents started speaking using the Spanish language (2007 Peru Census).

See also 
 Ancash Quechua

See also 
 Pukahirka
 Tawllirahu
 Tinya palla
 Wira Wira

External links
  Official website of the Pomabamba Province

References

1861 establishments in Peru
Districts of the Pomabamba Province
Districts of the Ancash Region